Caponi is an Italian surname. Notable people with the surname include:

Aldo Caponi (born 1939), better known as Don Backy, Italian singer, songwriter, and actor
Donna Caponi (born 1945), American golfer
Marco Antonio Caponi (born 1983), Argentine actor

Italian-language surnames